The Golden Age is the third studio album by American alternative rock band Cracker. It was released on April 2, 1996, by Virgin. Three singles were released from the album: "I Hate My Generation," "Nothing to Believe In," and "Sweet Thistle Pie."

Critical reception
The Los Angeles Times wrote: "Although irritatingly self-indulgent and arrogant at times, Lowery occasionally borders on brilliance. It’s possible that someone in the future will delve deeply into The Golden Age and find the portent of Sly Stone’s There’s a Riot Going On. For now, the album just feels slightly uninspired."  Alternative Rock called it "drily disappointing."

Track listing
All tracks written by David Lowery and Johnny Hickman, except where noted.
 "I Hate My Generation" – 2:57
 "I'm a Little Rocket Ship"  – 3:23
 "Big Dipper" (Lowery) – 5:40
 "Nothing to Believe In" (Lowery, Hickman, Bob Rupe) – 3:25
 "The Golden Age" – 3:44
 "100 Flower Power Maximum" (Lowery, Hickman, Rupe) – 2:39
 "Dixie Babylon" – 7:09
 "I Can't Forget You" (Lowery) – 4:08
 "Sweet Thistle Pie" – 5:00
 "Useless Stuff" – 2:19
 "How Can I Live Without You" – 3:27
 "Bicycle Spaniard" – 4:26

Chart performance

Musicians

Cracker:
 David Lowery – lead & backing vocals, guitar, synthesizer, Peavey analog filter, mellotron, handclaps, string arrangements, bass
 Johnny Hickman – lead guitar, backing vocals, guitar three hand, synthesizer, baritone guitar, talkbox, harmonica
 Bob Rupe – bass, synthesizers, synthesized bass, backing vocals
 Charlie Quintana – drums

Guests:
 Dennis Herring – acoustic guitar, mellotron, string arrangements
 Charlie Gillingham – organ
 David Immergluck – pedal steel, backing vocals
 Johnny Hott – percussion, programming
 David Campbell – string arrangements
 Eddie Bayers – drums, percussion
 Jim Cox – piano
 Rob Hajacos – fiddle
 John Hobbs – piano
 Tony Maimone – bass
 Joan Osborne – backing vocals

Strings
 Arranged & conducted by David Campbell
 Bob Becker, Denyse Buffum – viola
 Larry Corbett – cello, viola
 Armen Garabedian – violin
 Peter Kent – violin, concert master
 Sid Page – violin, concert master
 Suzie Katayama – cello, contractor
 Bob Peterson – violin
 Katia Popov – violin
 Michelle Richards – violin
 Bonnie Douglas Shure – violin
 Paul Shure – violin, theremin

Production
Produced By Dennis Herring & David Lowery
Joe Chiccarelli – engineer, recording
Wayne Cook – engineer
Chris Fuhrman – engineer, overdubs
Richard Hasal – engineer, overdubs
Amy Hughes – assistant engineer
Jim Labinski – assistant engineer
Marc Mann – engineer
Skidd Mills – assistant engineer
John Morand – assistant engineer
Csaba Petocz – engineer
Steve Sisco – mixing
Andy Wallace – mixing
Howie Weinberg – mastering
David Work – digital manipulation

References

1996 albums
Cracker (band) albums
Virgin Records albums
Albums arranged by David Campbell (composer)
Albums produced by David Lowery (musician)